Nina Schroth (born 16 August 1991) is a German weightlifter. She is a gold medalist at the European Weightlifting Championships.

Sports career 
At the 2019 European Weightlifting Championships held in Batumi, Georgia, she won the silver medal in the women's 81kg event. This became the gold medal after disqualification of the original gold medalist Eleni Konstantinidi of Greece.

References

External links 
 

Living people
1991 births
Place of birth missing (living people)
German female weightlifters
European Weightlifting Championships medalists
21st-century German women